Supriya Gupta Mohile is an American geriatric oncologist specialized in clinical trials and genitourinary and gastrointestinal cancers. She is a professor of Medicine and Surgery at the James P. Wilmot Cancer Center at the University of Rochester. Mohile holds the Philip and Marilyn Wehrheim Professorship. She completed a MD at the Thomas Jefferson Medical College in 1998. She completed a fellowship in oncology at the University of Chicago Medical Center.

References

External links
 

Living people
Year of birth missing (living people)
Place of birth missing (living people)
Jefferson Medical College alumni
University of Rochester faculty
American oncologists
American geriatricians
Women geriatricians
21st-century American women physicians
21st-century American physicians
21st-century American women scientists
American medical researchers
Women medical researchers
American women academics
American physicians of Indian descent
Physician-scientists